Shareef Adnan Nassar (born 21 January 1984) is a retired Jordanian footballer of Palestinian descent who played for Jordan national football team.

Honors and Participation in International tournaments

Pan Arab Games
2011 Pan Arab Games

WAFF Championships
2014 WAFF Championship

References

External links 
 
 
 
 

1984 births
Living people
Palestinian footballers
Palestine international footballers
Jordan international footballers
Jordanian people of Palestinian descent
Association football midfielders
Jordanian expatriate footballers
Jordanian footballers
Expatriate footballers in Saudi Arabia
Expatriate footballers in Bahrain
Jordanian expatriate sportspeople in Saudi Arabia
Jordanian expatriate sportspeople in Bahrain
Expatriate footballers in the State of Palestine
Jordanian expatriate sportspeople in the State of Palestine
Jordanian Pro League players
Bahraini Premier League players
Saudi Professional League players
West Bank Premier League players
Al-Faisaly SC players
Khaleej FC players
Shabab Al-Ordon Club players
Shabab Al-Khalil SC players
East Riffa Club players
Sportspeople from Amman